Wrocław Puppet Theater (also Teatr Lalek) is a theater in Wroclaw, Poland. It is located at the Theater Square in the old building of merchants association, next to the Old Town Garden and public baths.

History 
The  Neo-Baroque building was first designed by Blummer in 1892-1894, then was extended in 1905-1909 according to the architectural plans of Albert Grau.  It was established in 1946, principally as a children entertainment theatre, which also toured the villages of Lower Silesia.

These days apart from performances for children's theater, it also offers adult fare.  Since September 2007 Roberto Skolmowski is general and artistic director of the Wrocław Puppet Theatre.

Present 
Today, Wrocław Puppet Theater is an important European center of puppetry. It is confirmed by plenty awards and distinctions, as well as growing interest of foreign audience. Over the last three decades Puppet Theater has done over 50 tours in many European countries, such as Germany, Finland, France, Italy, Hungary, Sweden, Switzerland and Austria. The theater participated also in several festivals in Japan and both Americas.

Repertoire and attractions 
Puppet Theater has three independent inside stages: large scene with 250 seats, small scene with 80 seats and upstairs stage with 60 seats. 
In 2008 Puppet Theater launched “Bajkobus” (FairyBus), a mobile scene which is a mini-version of theater building. It contains two separate puppet scenes, creates unlimited staging possibilities. It enables acting in every kind of environment – “Bajkobus” is absolutely independent in terms of technical equipment.

In 2009 the theater started “Scena Nova” (New Scene), which is dedicated to an adult audience.

In 2010 “Ogród Staromiejski” (Old Town Garden) located next to the theater was renovated. Since then, Puppet Theater has been organizing numerous events on “Scena Letnia” (Summer Scene).

External links 
 teatrlalek.wroclaw.pl

Puppet
Tourist attractions in Wrocław
Puppet theaters
Puppet
Art Nouveau theatres